Gryon is a genus of parasitoid wasps in the family Platygastridae.

Species
Gryon austrafricanum Mineo, 1979
Gryon basilwskyi (Risbec, 1957)
Gryon basokoi (Risbec, 1958)
Gryon bimaculatum Mineo, 1983
Gryon bini Mineo, 1983
Gryon charon (Nixon, 1934)
Gryon coum (Nixon, 1934)
Gryon eugeniae (Risbec, 1953)
Gryon festivum (Kieffer, 1910)
Gryon fulviventre (Crawford, 1912)
Gryon giganteum Mineo, 1983
Gryon hiberus (Nixon, 1934)
Gryon ialokombae Mineo, 1983
Gryon iammancoi Mineo, 1983
Gryon janus (Nixon, 1934)
Gryon kelnerpillauti Mineo, 1983
Gryon kentyotum Mineo, 1982
Gryon letus (Nixon, 1934)
Gryon magnoculo Mineo, 1983
Gryon mirperusi (Risbec, 1950)
Gryon missellum Haliday, 1833Gryon morosum Mineo, 1983Gryon myndus (Nixon, 1934)Gryon naevium (Nixon, 1934)Gryon nitens (Szabó, 1963)Gryon oculatum Mineo, 1983Gryon odontogusi (Risbec, 1955)Gryon pappi Mineo, 1983Gryon paracharontis Mineo, 1982Gryon parasomaliense Mineo, 1983Gryon pisum Nixon, 1934
Gryon rhinocori (Risbec, 1950)
Gryon rugulosum (Fouts, 1934)
Gryon sancti Mineo, 1983
Gryon saxatile (Kieffer, 1910)
Gryon scutidepressi Mineo, 1983
Gryon sesbaniae (Risbec, 1956)
Gryon somaliense Mineo, 1983
Gryon urum Mineo, 1982
Gryon watshami Mineo, 1983
Gryon zimbabwense Mineo, 1983

References

Scelioninae
Insects described in 1833